Pseudotyphlopasilia is a genus of beetles belonging to the family Staphylinidae.

Species:

Pseudotyphlopasilia anophthalma 
Pseudotyphlopasilia coeca

References

Staphylinidae
Staphylinidae genera